Theodore Ernest Els (born 17 October 1969) is a South African professional golfer. A former , he is known as "The Big Easy" due to his imposing physical stature (he stands ) along with his fluid golf swing. Among his more than 70 career victories are four major championships: the U.S. Open in 1994 at Oakmont and in 1997 at Congressional, and The Open Championship in 2002 at Muirfield and in 2012 at Royal Lytham & St Annes. He is one of six golfers to twice win both the U.S. Open and The Open Championship.

Other highlights in Els's career include topping the 2003 and 2004 European Tour Order of Merit (money list), and winning the World Match Play Championship a record seven times. He was the leading career money winner on the European Tour until overtaken by Lee Westwood in 2011, and was the first member of the tour to earn over €25,000,000 from European Tour events. He has held the number one spot in the Official World Golf Ranking and until 2013 held the record for weeks ranked in the top ten with 788. Els rose to fifteenth in the world rankings after winning the 2012 Open Championship. He was elected to the World Golf Hall of Fame in 2010, on his first time on the ballot, and was inducted in May 2011.

Els now primarily plays on the PGA Tour Champions. When not playing, he has a golf course design business, a charitable foundation that supports golf among underprivileged youth in South Africa, and a winemaking business.

Background and family 
Growing up in Lambton, Germiston, South Africa, Els played rugby, cricket, tennis and, starting at age 8, golf. He was a skilled junior tennis player and won the Eastern Transvaal Junior Championships at age 13. Els first learned the game of golf from his father Neels, a trucking executive, at the Germiston Golf course, He was soon playing better than his father (and his older brother, Dirk), and by the age of 14 he was a scratch handicap. It was around this time that he decided to focus exclusively on golf.

Els first achieved prominence in 1984, when he won the Junior World Golf Championship in the Boys 13–14 category. Phil Mickelson was second to Els that year. Els won the South African Amateur a few months after his 17th birthday, becoming the youngest-ever winner of that event, breaking the record which had been held since 1935 by Bobby Locke. Els contested the 1987 British Amateur Championship, qualifying from stroke play for the 64-player match play segment, but was knocked out there.

Els married his wife Liezl in 1998 in Cape Town, and they have two children, Samantha and Ben. In 2008, after Els started to display an "Autism Speaks" logo on his golf bag it was announced that their then five-year-old son was autistic. Their main residence is at the Wentworth Estate near Wentworth Golf Club in the south of England. However, they also split time between South Africa and their family home in Jupiter, Florida, in order to get better treatment for Ben's autism.

Professional career

1989–1996: Early years and first major win 
In 1989, Els won the South African Amateur Stroke Play Championship and turned professional the same year. Els won his first professional tournament in 1991 on the Southern Africa Tour (today the Sunshine Tour). He won the Sunshine Tour Order of Merit in the 1991/92 and 1994/95 seasons. In 1993, Els won his first tournament outside of South Africa at the Dunlop Phoenix in Japan. In 1994 Els won his first major championship at the U.S. Open. Els was tied with Colin Montgomerie and Loren Roberts after 72 holes and they went to an 18-hole playoff the next day. In spite of starting the playoff bogey-triple bogey, Els was able to match Roberts' score of 74. Els birdied the second hole of sudden death to win his first U.S. Open title.

Els brought his game all around the world in his young career winning the Dubai Desert Classic on the European Tour, and the Toyota World Match Play Championship defeating once again Colin Montgomerie 4 & 2. The following year, Els defended his World Match Play Championship, defeating Steve Elkington 3 & 1. Els won the GTE Byron Nelson Classic in the United States then headed back home to South Africa and won twice more. In 1996, Els won his third straight World Match Play Championship at Wentworth, defeating Vijay Singh in the final 3 & 2. No player in history had ever managed to win three successive titles in the one-on-one tournament. Els finished the year with a win at his home tournament at the South African Open.

1997–2002: Career years and multi-major championships 
1997 was a career year for Els first winning his second U.S. Open (once again over Colin Montgomerie) this time at Congressional Country Club, making him the first foreign player since Alex Smith (1906, 1910) to win the U.S. Open twice. He defended his Buick Classic title and added the Johnnie Walker Classic to his list of victories. Els nearly won the World Match Play Championship for a fourth consecutive year, but lost to Vijay Singh in the final. 1998 and 1999 continued to be successful years for Els with 4 wins on both the PGA and European tours.

2000 started with Els being given a special honour by the board of directors of the European Tour awarding him with honorary life membership of the European Tour because of his two U.S. Opens and three World Match Play titles. 2000 was the year of runners-up for Els; with three runner-up finishes in the Majors (Masters, U.S. Open and The Open Championship) and seven second-place finishes in tournaments worldwide. In 2001 Els failed to win a US PGA tour event for the first time since 1994 although he ended the year with nine second-place finishes.

2002 was arguably Els's best year, which started with a win at the Heineken Classic at the Royal Melbourne Golf Club. Then went to America and outplayed World Number one Tiger Woods to lift the Genuity Championship title. The premier moment of the season was surely his Open Championship triumph in very tough conditions at Muirfield. Els overcame a four-man playoff to take home the famous Claret Jug trophy for the first time, also quieting his critics about his mental toughness. The South African also won his fourth World Match Play title, along with his third Nedbank Challenge in the last four years, dominating a world-class field and winning by 8 shots.

2003–2005: The Big Five 

2003 gave Els his first European Tour Order of Merit. Although playing fewer events than his competitors Els won four times and had three runners-up. He also performed well in the United States with back to back victories at the Mercedes Championship – where he set the all-time PGA Tour 72-hole record for most strokes under par at 31 under – and Sony Open and achieved top-20 spots in all four majors, including a fifth-place finish at the U.S Open and sixth-place finishes at both the Masters and PGA Championship. To top off the season Els won the World Match Play title for a record-tying fifth time. In 2003 he was voted 37th on the SABC3's Great South Africans.

2004 was another successful year as Els won 6 times on both tours, including big wins at Memorial, WGC-American Express Championship and his sixth World Match Play Championship, a new record. His success did not stop there. Els showed remarkable consistency in the Majors but lost to Phil Mickelson in the Masters when Mickelson birdied the 18th for the title, finished ninth in the U.S. Open after playing in the final group with friend and fellow countryman Retief Goosen and surprisingly lost in a playoff in the Open to the then-unknown Todd Hamilton. Els had a  putt for birdie on the final hole of regulation for the Open at Royal Troon, but he missed the putt and lost in the playoff. Els ended the major season with a fourth-place finish in the PGA Championship, where a three-putt on the 72nd hole would cost him a place in the playoff. In total, Els had 16 top-10 finishes, a second European Order of Merit title in succession and a second-place finish on the United States money list.

2004 was the start of the "Big Five Era", which is used in describing the era in golf where Tiger Woods, Vijay Singh, Ernie Els, Retief Goosen and Phil Mickelson dominated the game of golf. The five switched up and down the top five positions in the World Golf Ranking; most notably Vijay Singh's derailment of Tiger Woods as the best golfer in the world. The five stayed, for the most part, in the top five spots from 2004 until the start of 2007. Nine majors were won between them, many fighting against each other head to head.

In July 2005, Els injured his left knee while sailing with his family in the Mediterranean. Despite missing several months of the 2005 season due to the injury, Els won the second event on his return, the Dunhill Championship.

With his victory at the 2005 Qatar Masters, an event co-sanctioned by the Asian Tour, Els became the second golfer after Lee Westwood to win on all six of the big tours on the International Federation of PGA Tours.

2006–2011: Gradual recovery and comeback 
At the start of the 2007 season, Ernie Els laid out a three-year battle plan to challenge Tiger Woods as world number one. "I see 2007 as the start of a three-year plan where I totally re-dedicate myself to the game," Els told his official website.

When he missed the cut by two strokes at the 2007 Masters Tournament, Els ended tour-leading consecutive cut streaks on both the PGA Tour and the European Tour. On the PGA Tour, his streak began at the 2004 The Players Championship (46 events) and on the European Tour it began at the 2000 Johnnie Walker Classic (82 events)

Els has often been compared to Greg Norman in the sense that both men's careers could be looked back on and think what could have been. Although the two of them are multiple major championship winners, both share disappointment in majors. Their disappointments have ranged from nerves, bad luck, and being outplayed. 1996 was the year where Norman collapsed in the Masters, whereas the year before Els did in the PGA Championship. Nearly four years later, Els finished runner-up in the 2000 Masters Tournament, and again in 2004, losing to Phil Mickelson. Els has finished runner-up in six majors, finishing runner-up to Tiger Woods more than any other golfer, and has often been described as having the right game to finally be the golfer to beat Woods in a major.

On 2 March 2008, Els won the Honda Classic contested at PGA National's Championship Course in Palm Beach Gardens, Florida. Els shot a final round 67 in tough windy conditions, which was enough to give him the win by one stroke over Luke Donald. The win marked the end of a three and a half-year-long stretch without a win on the PGA Tour for Els. The win was also his 16th victory on the PGA Tour.

On 8 April 2008, Els officially announced that he was switching swing coaches from David Leadbetter (whom Els had worked with since 1990) to noted swing coach Butch Harmon. During Els's 2008 Masters press conference Els, said the change is in an effort to tighten his swing, shorten his swing, and get a fresh perspective.

Els finally did break his winless streak by capturing the WGC-CA Championship at Doral in 2010, winning by four strokes over fellow countryman Charl Schwartzel. It was Els's second WGC tournament title. The victory also saw Els overtake Colin Montgomerie to become the career money leader on the European Tour. Els then won the Arnold Palmer Invitational at Bay Hill two weeks later. It was his 18th PGA Tour victory, and his second in as many starts. The win at Bay Hill also vaulted Els to the top of the FedEx Cup standings.  He held the top spot for 22 consecutive weeks.

In June, Els almost captured his third U.S. Open title at Pebble Beach.  Els briefly held a share of the lead after birding the sixth hole, but was derailed by a stretch of bogey, double bogey, bogey on 9,10, and 11. Els finished the tournament in solo 3rd.

Els capped his year by winning the PGA Grand Slam of Golf in October, with a one stroke victory over David Toms, and also capturing the South African Open title by beating Retief Goosen by one shot.

After his successful 2010 season, Els struggled to find his form in 2011.  He ultimately dropped out of the top 50 in the Official World Golf Ranking for the first time since 1993.

2012–present: fourth major championship and career volatility 
Els started the 2012 season in his home country at the Volvo Golf Champions where he finished in a tie for second place after he and Retief Goosen lost out in a playoff to Branden Grace. Els was next in contention at the Transitions Championship, where he needed a win to qualify for the 2012 Masters.  Els led the tournament for most of the final round and had the lead outright until the 16th hole. However, he finished the tournament bogey-bogey missing a short three-footer on the last hole to make a playoff. The tournament was eventually won by Luke Donald. In April, Els failed to qualify for the Masters for the first time since 1993. He was ranked 58th in the world prior to the tournament (the top 50 are given automatic invitations). Ultimately, Els's unsuccessful bids to qualify for the Masters was viewed as the likely end of his competitiveness on the PGA Tour.

Els surprised the golfing world by winning the 2012 Open Championship in July by birding the 72nd hole. Adam Scott led by four shots after a birdie at the 14th hole, but bogeyed the final four holes to miss a playoff with Els by one stroke. Els's win rejuvenated his career and earned him 5-year exemptions to the other 3 majors. Els became the eighth player to win major tournaments in three different decades, joining his countryman Gary Player, Jack Nicklaus, Lee Trevino, Billy Casper, Raymond Floyd, John Henry Taylor, and Harry Vardon (Tiger Woods has since become the ninth). Els's win also marked the third major champion out of the previous four major championships to be won with a type of long putter.  His win reignited the controversy over the legality of long or anchored putters in golf.

In June 2013, Els won for the first time since the 2012 Open Championship at the BMW International Open in Munich, Germany. He claimed a wire-to-wire victory with a one-stroke win over Thomas Bjørn for his 28th European Tour title. Els moved up to 14th from 20th in the world rankings after the win.

Els struggled to find his form throughout the 2014 season. He finished 4th at the WGC-Accenture Match Play Championship in February, 5th at The Barclays and 7th at the PGA Championship, but struggled with missed cuts, including a missed cut at the Masters in April. Els's struggles continued into 2015 when he made only 10 cuts on the PGA Tour. He finished a 173rd in the FedEx Cup and failed to qualify for the playoffs. In preparation for the anchored putter ban in 2016, Els switched back to the short putter in late 2015. Els's struggles with short putts, or the "yips," became the draw of much media attention in early 2016. At the 2016 Masters Tournament, Els's putting was again the source of negative publicity when he six-putted from 3 feet on his opening hole.  Els recorded a 9 on the hole and ended up shooting 80–73 and missing the cut. After the Masters, Els thanked his fans on his website for their support and was admittedly embarrassed by his putting performance.

2020: PGA Tour Champions debut 
In January 2020, Els joined the PGA Tour Champions shortly after his 50th birthday. In January 2020, Els shot 72-65-65 to tie for the lead of his first PGA Tour Champions event, the Mitsubishi Electric Championship at Hualalai. Miguel Ángel Jiménez and Fred Couples also qualified for the playoff. Jiménez won the event with a birdie on the second playoff hole.

In March 2020, Els won the Hoag Classic in Newport Beach, California. Els finished with a 4-under-par 67 to finish 54 holes in 16-under-par 197, two strokes ahead of Fred Couples, Robert Karlsson, and Glen Day. This was just Els's third start on the PGA Tour Champions.

In October 2020, Els won the SAS Championship in Cary, North Carolina. Els shot a 6-under-par 66 in the final round to win by one stroke over Colin Montgomerie.

Other ventures

Els-designed golf courses 
Anahita Golf Course – Beau Champ, Mauritius
Mission Hills Golf Club (The Savannah Course) – Shenzhen, China
Whiskey Creek – Ijamsville, Maryland, USA
Oubaai – Garden Route, South Africa
The Els Club – Dubai, UAE
The Els Club Teluk Datai - Langkawi, Malaysia
The Els Club Desaru Coast - Desaru, Malaysia
The Els Club Copperleaf Golf and Country Estate – Gauteng, South Africa

Els is also responsible for the refinement and modernisation of the West Course, Wentworth-Virginia Water, England, which took place in 2006.

Courses under construction include:

Hoakalei Country Club at Hoakalei Resort – Ewa Beach, Hawaii
Albany – New Providence, The Bahamas
Ecopark - Hanoi, Vietnam
Durrat Al Bahrain Golf Course – Durrat Al Bahrain, Bahrain

Internationalization of golf
Unlike most of his contemporaries, Els is known for his willingness to participate in tournaments all around the world, having played regularly in European Tour-sanctioned events in Asia, Australasia and his native country of South Africa. He says that his globe-trotting schedule is in recognition of the global nature of golf. This has caused some friction with the PGA Tour, an organisation that would prefer Els to play more tournaments in the United States. In late 2004, Tim Finchem, the director of the PGA Tour, wrote quite a firm letter to Els asking him to do so but Els publicized and rejected this request. The PGA Tour's attitude caused considerable offense in the golfing world outside of North America.

Foundation 
The Ernie Els and Fancourt Foundation was established in 1999. It has the objective of identifying youths from under-privileged backgrounds who show talent and potential in the game of golf. It provides educational assistance amongst other moral and financial help in order for these youths to reach their full potential.

The first Friendship Cup was played in 2006 which is a match play competition, played in a Ryder Cup type format. In the cup, Els's foundation plays against the foundation of Tiger Woods. Els's foundation won 12.5 points to 3.5 points.

Els has also participated several times in the Gary Player Invitational series of charity golf events, to assist Player in raising significant funds for underprivileged children around the world.

Autism-related activities 
Since his son's autism diagnosis, Els and his wife have been active in charities devoted to that condition. This involvement has increased as Ben has reached school age. In 2009, Els launched an annual charity golf event, the Els for Autism Pro-Am, held at the PGA National Resort & Spa in Palm Beach Gardens near his South Florida residence during the PGA Tour's March swing into the area. The first event, which featured many PGA Tour and Champions Tour golfers, raised $725,000 for The Renaissance Learning Center, a nonprofit charter school in the area for autistic children. The couple has also established the Els Center of Excellence, which began as a drive to build a new campus for the aforementioned school in Jupiter, Florida, but has since expanded into a $30 million plan to combine the school with a research facility.

ASM Scholarships 
Ernie Els Co-Founder an athletic scholarship agency called (ASM Scholarships), in October 2018. The company is a college recruiting service that works with athletes worldwide from various sports and helps them secure athletic scholarships to American universities within the NCAA, NAIA and NJCAA. The company is owned by the ASM Sports Group, which has built a pathway for athletes from high school to college then professional sports or a career in a sporting job. In 2020 the company helped over 1000 athletes secure sport scholarships on average of $35,000 per year for student athletes, a total of $35,000,000. The company HQ is based in West Palm Beach Florida.
Ernie Els Press release on the company https://ernieels.com/golf/sponsors/asm-sports-group/

Quotes 
On his technique:

—Els on his son's autism:

Amateur wins
1984 World Junior Golf Championships (Boys 13–14 division)
1986 South African Boys Championship, South African Amateur
1989 South African Amateur Stroke Play Championship

Professional wins (75)

PGA Tour wins (19)

PGA Tour playoff record (4–4)

European Tour wins (28) 

1Co-sanctioned by the Sunshine Tour
2Co-sanctioned by the PGA Tour of Australasia
3Co-sanctioned by the Asian Tour

European Tour playoff record (2–5)

Japan Golf Tour wins (1)

Asian Tour wins (3)

1Co-sanctioned by the European Tour
2Co-sanctioned by the PGA Tour of Australasia

Asian Tour playoff record (0–1)

Sunshine Tour wins (18)

1Co-sanctioned by the European Tour

Sunshine Tour playoff record (1–1)

Other wins (18)

Other playoff record (3–2)

PGA Tour Champions wins (3)

PGA Tour Champions playoff record (0–1)

Major championships

Wins (4)

1Defeated Montgomerie in 18-hole playoff and Roberts in sudden-death: Els (74-4-4), Roberts (74-4-5), Montgomerie (78) 
2Defeated Appleby and Elkington in 4-hole playoff and Levet in sudden-death: Els (4-3-5-4-par), Appleby (4-3-5-5), Elkington (5-3-4-5), Levet (4-2-5-5-bogey)

Results timeline
Results not in chronological order in 2020.

CUT = missed the half-way cut
"T" = tied
NT = No tournament due to COVID-19 pandemic

Summary

Most consecutive cuts made – 27 (2000 Masters – 2006 PGA)
Longest streak of top-10s – 5 (2003 PGA – 2004 PGA)

Results in The Players Championship

CUT = missed the halfway cut
"T" indicates a tie for a place

World Golf Championships

Wins (2)

Results timeline

1Cancelled due to 9/11

QF, R16, R32, R64 = Round in which player lost in match play
"T" = tied
WD = withdrew
NT = No tournament
Note that the HSBC Champions did not become a WGC event until 2009.

Results in senior major championships

"T" indicates a tie for a place
NT = No tournament due to COVID-19 pandemic

PGA and European Tour career summary

* As of 27 September 2020.

These figures are from the respective tour's official sites. Note that there is double counting of money earned (and wins) in the majors and World Golf Championships since they became official events on both tours.

Team appearances 
Professional
Alfred Dunhill Cup (representing South Africa): 1992, 1993, 1994, 1995, 1996, 1997 (winners), 1998 (winners), 1999, 2000
World Cup (representing South Africa): 1992, 1993, 1996 (Individual and team winners), 1997, 2001 (winners)
Presidents Cup (International team): 1996, 1998 (winners), 2000, 2003 (tie), 2007, 2009, 2011, 2013, 2019 (non-playing captain)
Alfred Dunhill Challenge (representing Southern Africa): 1995 (winners)

See also 

Big Easy Tour
List of men's major championships winning golfers
List of World Number One male golfers
List of golfers with most PGA Tour wins
List of golfers with most European Tour wins
List of African golfers
List of celebrities who own wineries and vineyards
Monday Night Golf

References

External links 

South African male golfers
Sunshine Tour golfers
European Tour golfers
PGA Tour golfers
PGA Tour Champions golfers
Winners of men's major golf championships
World Golf Hall of Fame inductees
Golf writers and broadcasters
South African health activists
Autism activists
South African expatriate sportspeople in England
White South African people
Golfers from Johannesburg
People from George, South Africa
People from Virginia Water
Sportspeople from Germiston
1969 births
Living people